The Victorian Minister for Police, the Minister for Emergency Services, and the Minister for Ambulance Services, are ministers in the Government of Victoria who have responsibilities which includes conduct and regulation of all police and services agencies and personnel and also deals with operational and event planning issues, and for fire and rescue services, and all ambulance services in Victoria, Australia. 

The current Minister for Police, since 27 June 2022, is Anthony Carbines; the current Minister for Emergency Services, since 23 August 2021, is Jaclyn Symes; and the current Minister for Ambulance Services, since 27 June 2022, is Mary-Anne Thomas.

The ministers undertake their work through Victoria Police, the Victorian Office of Police Integrity, the State Emergency Service, Fire Rescue Victoria, the Country Fire Authority, and Ambulance Victoria.

List of ministers

Police

Emergency Services

Ambulance Services

References

Victoria State Government
Police
Victoria